Friedrich Wilhelm Leopold Pfeil (28 March 1783 – 4 September 1859) was a German forester.

Pfeil was born in Rammelburg. From 1801 onward, he trained and worked as a forester at several sites in the Harz region, Neuchâtel and Silesia. As a soldier in the Napoleonic Wars he fought at the Battles of Großbeeren and Wartenburg. From 1816 he was employed as a forester in the service of Heinrich Karl Erdmann, prince of Carolath-Beuthen. In 1821 he was awarded an honorary doctorate at the University of Berlin, and despite lacking a university education, was named a professor of forest science. In 1830 when the department of forestry was relocated to Eberswalde, he was named its director, a position he maintained up until his retirement in 1859.

From 1822 to 1859 he was editor of the journal Kritische Blätter für Forst- und Jagdwissenschaft — after his death, Hermann von Nördlinger continued as its editor. Pfeil died in Warmbrunn. From 1863 to 2005 the "Wilhelm-Leopold-Pfeil-Preis" was awarded for contributions made towards future forest management in Europe.

Selected works 
 Grundsätze der Forstwirthschaft in bezug auf die Nationalökonomie und die Staatsfinanzwissenschaft, 1822 – Principles of forestry management in regards to the national economy and state finances.
 Forstbenutzung und Forsttechnologie, 1831 – Forestry and forest technology.
 Kurze Anweisung zur Jagdwissenschaft für Gutsbesitzer und Forstliebhaber, 1831 – Brief instruction on the science of hunting.
 Neue vollständige Anleitung zur Behandling, Benutzung und Schätzung der Forsten; ein Handbuch für Forstbesitzer und Forstbeamte, (5 volumes, 1830–33) – New comprehensive guide on the treatment, use and estimation of forests.
 Die Forstpolizeigesetze Deutschlands und Frankreichs nach ihren grundsätzen, 1834 – The German and French forestry regulation system.
 Das forstliche verhalten der deutschen waldbaume und ihre erziehung, 1839 – Characteristics of German forest trees. 
 Die Forstwirthschaft nach rein praktischer Ansicht; ein Handbuch fur Privatforstbesitzer, Verwalter und ins besondere fur Forstlehrlinge, (2nd edition, 1839) – Forest management from a practical viewpoint.
 Forstschutz und Forstpolizeilehre, im Anhange die Nachweisung der preussischen Forstpolizeigesetze (2nd edition, 1845) – Forestry and forestry regulation.
 Die Forsttaxation in ihrem ganzen Umfange, (3rd edition, 1838).

References 

1783 births
1859 deaths
People from Mansfeld
German foresters
Humboldt University of Berlin alumni
Academic staff of the Humboldt University of Berlin